The Yugoslavia men's national under-18 basketball team was the boys' basketball team, administered by Basketball Federation of Yugoslavia, that represented SFR Yugoslavia in international under-18 (under age 18) men's basketball competitions, consisted mainly of the European Championship for Juniors, nowadays known as the FIBA Europe Under-18 Championship.

After the dissolution of SFR Yugoslavia in 1991, the successor countries all set up their own national under-18 teams. Serbia and Croatia teams won the Championship for three times each, as of 2017.

Several team members have been inducted into the FIBA Hall of Fame, including players Krešimir Ćosić, Mirza Delibašić, Zoran Slavnić, Dragan Kićanović, Vlade Divac, Jure Zdovc, Toni Kukoč, Dražen Petrović, and coaches Ranko Žeravica, Bogdan Tanjević, Mirko Novosel, Dušan Ivković, and Svetislav Pešić. Also, Dino Rađa, Divac, Petrović, Kukoč, and Novosel are members of the Naismith Memorial Basketball Hall of Fame. 

Bogdan Tanjević is the only individual who respresented the team both as a player (1964) and a head coach (1974).

Individual awards 
Top Scorer
 Vinko Jelovac — 1968

Competitive record

Coaches

Rosters

New national teams 
After the dissolution of SFR Yugoslavia in 1991, five new countries were created: Bosnia and Herzegovina, Croatia, FYR Macedonia, FR Yugoslavia (in 2003, renamed to Serbia and Montenegro) and Slovenia. In 2006, Montenegro became an independent nation and Serbia became the legal successor of Serbia and Montenegro. In 2008, Kosovo declared independence from Serbia and became a FIBA member in 2015.

Here is a list of men's national under-18 teams on the SFR Yugoslavia area:
  (1992–present)
  (1992–present)
  (1993–present)
  (1992–2006)
  (2006–present)
  (2006–present)
  (2015–present)
  (1992–present)

See also 
 Yugoslavia men's national under-19 basketball team
 Yugoslavia men's national under-16 basketball team

References

M U18
Men's national under-18 basketball teams